The net worth of Donald Trump is not publicly known. Various news organizations have attempted to estimate his wealth. Forbes estimates it at $3.2 billion as of October 26, 2022, with Trump making much higher claims. Trump received a loan of one million US dollars from his father, and he has also made money from real estate ventures, hotels, casinos, golf courses,fundraising and Trump-branded products including neckties and steaks.

Gifts, loans, and other wealth from his father
According to a New York Times report in 2018, Trump received at least $413 million (in 2018 prices) from his father's business empire. Drawing upon more than 100,000 pages of tax returns and financial records from Fred Trump's businesses and interviews with former advisers and employees, the Times found 295 distinct streams of revenue that Fred Trump created over five decades in order to channel his wealth to his son.

When Trump has spoken of the money he received from his father, he typically downplays the actual amount. He prefers to have a reputation as a self-made man. For example, in a 2007 sworn deposition, he acknowledged borrowing $9.6 million from his father's estate, and on the presidential campaign trail in 2015, he acknowledged borrowing $1 million from his father as a young adult. He described both of these amounts as "small" and emphasized that he repaid both loans "with interest." These amounts are indeed small fractions of the entire amount he received from his father. The facts may affect his public image. According to a 2019 study in the journal Political Behavior, many voters who perceived Trump as a keen businessman and the right choice for the presidency changed their opinions when told that he inherited a lot of his money from his father.

Trust funds
Trump is the beneficiary of several trust funds set up by his father and paternal grandmother beginning in 1949 when he was three years old. According to The New York Times, he "was a millionaire by age 8." In 1976, Fred Trump set up trust funds of $1 million ($ million in  dollars) for each of his five children and three grandchildren. Donald Trump received $90,000 in 1980 and $214,605 in 1981 through the fund.

Alleged tax-fraud schemes

Donald Trump was involved in a number of allegedly fraudulent tax schemes. For four years, Fred Trump held shares in the Trump Palace condos, and in 1991 he sold them to his son well below their purchase price, masking what could be considered a hidden donation and giving him the benefit of a tax write-off. In 2018, when the matter came to light, the New York State tax department and New York City officials said they would investigate.

After a Supreme Court ruling on February 22, 2021 cleared the path for Trump's tax records to be reviewed by a grand jury, the Mazars accounting firm turned over millions of pages of documents, including Trump's tax returns from January 2011 to August 2019, to the office of the Manhattan district attorney (DA). In early 2022, Mazars notified Trump that it did not trust the reliability of the information he had provided them for a decade, and thus it no longer backed the financial statements it had prepared for him, and it said it would no longer serve as his accountant.

In late 2022, the House Ways and Means Committee received Trump's tax returns and publicly released them.

Inheritance
In 1993, when Trump took two loans totaling $30 million from his siblings, their anticipated shares of Fred's estate amounted to $3.5 million each. Upon Fred Trump's death in 1999, his will divided $20 million after taxes among his surviving children.

Pre-presidency

Lawsuits

Investment performance 
A 2016 analysis of Trump's business career in The Economist concluded that his performance since 1985 had been "mediocre compared with the stock market and property in New York". A subsequent analysis in The Washington Post similarly noted that Trump's estimated net worth of $100 million in 1978 would have increased to $6 billion by 2016 if he had invested it in a typical retirement fund, and concluded that "Trump is a mix of braggadocio, business failures, and real success."

The Apprentice
From his television show The Apprentice, as well as subsequent related licensing and endorsements, Trump received $427.4 million from the show's beginning in 2004 through 2018.

Due largely to income received from the show, he paid a combined $70.1 million in federal taxes in 2005, 2006, and 2007. He paid no taxes in 2008. When he filed taxes in 2009, he declared over $700 million in business losses and, on that basis, he asked for a refund of his federal income taxes paid in 2005–2007. He was eventually refunded the $70.1 million plus over $2.7 million in interest. As of 2020, auditors are still considering the matter. If he is asked to return that federal refund, then, considering added interest and penalties, he may owe over $100 million to the federal government.

The New York Times said: "He also received $21.2 million in state and local refunds, which often piggyback on federal filings," and he may be obligated to return those refunds, too.

Foundation 

Trump formed his own charitable foundation in 1988. In the first decade of the 2000s, he gave away $2.8 million through the foundation (though he had pledged three times that amount). He stopped personally contributing to the foundation in 2008, though he accepted donations from others. In 2018, the foundation agreed to shut down. It was facing a civil lawsuit by the New York attorney general (AG) that alleged "persistently illegal conduct" including self-dealing and funneling campaign contributions. Furthermore, it had never been properly certified in New York and did not submit to the annual audit that would have been required. In November 2019, Trump was ordered to pay a $2 million settlement for misusing the foundation for his business and political purposes.

Presidency 
During his campaign, the Trump Organization owed nearly $20 million to L/P Daewoo, a company with ties to North Korea. This debt was not mentioned in the Trump campaign's financial disclosure filings. The loan was paid off five months into his presidency.

During his presidency, Trump reported over $1.6 billion of outside revenue and income from his companies, including the Trump Organization. "While Trump publicly took credit for donating his taxpayer-funded salary," Citizens for Responsibility and Ethics in Washington noted, the presidential salary he donated was not even one-thousandth of what he was earning as a businessman.

Political donations from small and large donors alike ended up funding Trump's personal businesses. During his presidency, his businesses received $8.5 million from political fundraising under his control, including the Trump campaign, and $2 million from other Republican fundraising sources.

Though the Trump Organization claimed it would let federal employees who traveled with President Trump stay his properties “for free” or “at cost”, it charged the Secret Service up to $1,185 per night, generating over $1.4 million in Secret Service lodging expenses over four years. This bill is charged to taxpayers and paid to the Trump Organization.

During the first two years of his term, the governments of China, Turkey, Malaysia, Saudi Arabia, Qatar and the United Arab Emirates spent a combined total of over $700,000 at the Trump International Hotel in Washington, D.C.

For federal income taxes, Trump paid $750 in 2017; a combined $1.1 million in 2018 and 2019 (when his taxable income was nearly $23 million and nearly $3 million respectively); and nothing in 2020 (when he reported a loss of over $16 million).

Post-presidency 
After Trump lost the 2020 election, Deutsche Bank senior banker Rosemary Vrablic announced on December 22, 2020, that she was resigning from the bank effective December 31. The reasons for her resignation were unknown, but the New York Times provided context: In 2011, Vrablic had taken Trump as a client and loaned him $300 million, although this was controversial within the bank, especially as Trump had defaulted on a large loan they'd given him just three years earlier. She also engaged in personal business transactions with Trump. It was expected that Deutsche Bank employees would be asked to testify before a grand jury in the criminal investigations of the Manhattan DA.

Following the storming of the U.S. Capitol on January 6, 2021, Trump suddenly lost a number of platforms and relationships, including Twitter, Facebook, Stripe, Shopify, and a PGA Championship that was to be held at one of his golf courses. Deutsche Bank said it would no longer do business with Trump, while Signature Bank (an American company) not only began closing his accounts but also called for him to resign the presidency. New York City revoked its contracts with the Trump Organization, which include ice skating rinks and a carousel at Central Park and the Trump Golf Links at the Ferry Point golf course in the Bronx, for which it had been paying the Trump Organization $17 million per year. The real estate firm Cushman & Wakefield said it would no longer handle leasing for the Trump Tower or 40 Wall Street.

As Trump's presidency ended, a number of Mar-a-Lago members were quietly abandoning their paying memberships, according to journalist Laurence Leamer, who had written a book about the resort two years previously. In March 2021, the beach club and dining room were temporarily shut down after staff were diagnosed with COVID-19. In early 2021, after leaving the presidency, Trump was working out of Mar-a-Lago, where he converted a bridal suite into an office.

Two months after Biden's inauguration, it was reported that Trump's personal Boeing 757 was in need of repairs and that it had not flown since his presidential term ended.

In November 2021, Trump released a coffeetable book, Our Journey Together, that sold for $75 per copy and had gross sales of $20 million within two months. He used images taken by taxpayer-funded White House photographers, though he did not credit the source for any of the images.

On May 11, 2022, the Trump Organization sold its lease of the Old Post Office in Washington, D.C. for a $100 million profit. Earlier that year, the House Oversight Committee had tried to prevent Trump from selling, arguing that he had given the U.S. General Services Administration (GSA) "at least one financial statement with possible material misrepresentations" and should not be "rewarded" for "seeking to profit off the presidency." He ran the Trump International Hotel from 2016 to 2022 out of the Old Post Office, where the GSA gave him a 60-year lease in 2013.

Fundraising 
A number of large companies halted their political contributions to Trump after the storming of the Capitol, and, coincidentally, Trump's largest political donor, Sheldon Adelson, died on January 11, 2021. Overall, however, Trump raised more funds than others. In April 2021, a Trump adviser claimed that Trump's available political funds ($85 million) roughly equalled the RNC's ($84 million). And at the end of January 2022, the Save America PAC had $108 million, more than double what the Republican National Committee had.

Over less than two years — 2021 (after he left office) and 2022 — his political committees spent over $900,000 at his properties, according to Federal Election Commission filings analyzed by the HuffPost.

Save America PAC 
After losing the November 2020 election, Trump formed a political action committee (PAC) called "Save America". Beginning the day after the election and continuing until the vote certification on January 6, 2021, Trump's mass emails to his supporters asked for small-dollar contributions to the "Official Election Defense Fund," which did not exist; all the funds raised went to Save America. According to filings with the Federal Election Commission, the PAC had raised $31 million by the end of 2020 and $255.4 million by the end of January 2021.

"Save America" is also entitled to $45 million from the Trump Make America Great Again Committee, which raised those funds together with the Republican National Committee (RNC). While Trump had claimed the money would go toward challenging his own 2020 election loss and supporting Republicans in the Georgia Senate runoff election, the money was not used for these purposes. Trump may use this money for his legal defense for his second impeachment trial, or he can donate it to other political candidates. By mid-2022, 69 Trump allies had received $350,000 from Save America. Some of it was also spent at Trump Organization properties. In September 2022, it was reported that the Save America PAC had advanced $3 million to lawyer Chris Kise to defend Trump in the Justice Department probe of the presidential records seized at Mar-a-Lago.

A Trump fundraising email on March 8, 2021, told donors that their money should go to the Save America PAC rather than to "RINOs" (“Republicans in name only"). As of March 2021, Trump's website said that 90% of new donations would go to the Save America PAC and the remainder to the Make America Great Again (MAGA) PAC, a new entity he created on February 27, 2021, with the remaining $8 million from the former Donald J. Trump For President campaign committee. He made his first in-person fundraising request in a public setting on February 28 at the Conservative Political Action Conference. In mid-2021, it was anticipated that Trump would encounter difficulty maintaining his donor lists, however, given that Facebook was still not allowing him to use its platform.

The Save America PAC raised around $75 million during the first half of 2021. Though some was spent on Trump's travel costs, legal costs, and staff costs, none was spent on ballot reviews of the 2020 election, despite advertisements for donors to "join the fight to secure our elections". By the end of June 2021, the Save America PAC had paid over $200,000 to a legal firm associated with Trump's interactions with the House Select Committee on the January 6 Attack while paying nothing for the defense of hundreds of Trump supporters facing charges related to January 6. At that time, the Save America PAC and MAGA PAC combined had nearly $102 million in cash reserves.

The Save America PAC donated nothing to other candidates in January 2022. Through February 2022, it gave $205,000 to 41 federal candidates and $145,500 to 29 state candidates while sitting on over $110 million. It had over $99 million in cash at the end of July 2022 and $93 million at the end of August 2022. In October 2022, it transferred $60 million to the Make America Great Again Inc. super PAC (which also took in millions of dollars from other sources). The MAGA Inc. super PAC spent only $15 million on Republican Senate candidates in the November 2022 midterm elections; with $54 million remaining, it said its new goal was to reelect Trump in 2024.

In the third quarter of 2022, Trump spent $22 million to fundraise $24 million.

In 2022, the Save America PAC paid over $120,000 to the Brand Woodward Law firm, paying legal bills for Kash Patel and Walt Nauta, both of whom testified regarding the government documents Trump took to Mar-a-Lago.

Republican National Committee funds 
Between October 2021 and July 2022, the RNC paid nearly $2 million to Trump's lawyers. The RNC warned it would stop these payments if Trump declared a bid in the 2024 election, on the grounds that it doesn't take sides in a presidential primary.

Donor refunds 
In September and October 2020, the for-profit donation processor WinRed presented recurring donations as the default option, a feature that was revealed in the fine print. From mid-October 2020 to the end of 2020, the Trump campaign and the RNC refunded over $64 million to online donors who had complained they had only meant to make one-time contributions. During the first half of 2021, another $12.8 million was refunded.

Investigations 
In September 2022, the Justice Department issued a grand jury subpoena to the Save America PAC. Subpoenas were also served to former Trump aides Stephen Miller and Brian Jack.

Net worth

Discrepancies in the estimates of various organizations are due in part to the uncertainty of appraised property values, as well as Trump's own assessment of the value of his personal brand.

1980s and 1990s 

Trump was listed on the initial Forbes List of wealthy individuals in 1982 as having a share of his family's estimated $200 million net worth. Former Forbes reporter Jonathan Greenberg said in 2018 that during the 1980s Trump had deceived him about his actual net worth and his share of the family assets in order to appear on the list. According to Greenberg,"it took decades to unwind the elaborate farce Trump had enacted to project an image as one of the richest people in America. Nearly every assertion supporting that claim was untrue. Trump wasn't just poorer than he said he was. Over time, I have learned that he should not have been on the first three Forbes 400 lists at all. In our first-ever list, in 1982, we included him at $100 million, but Trump was actually worth roughly $5 million—a paltry sum by the standards of his super-monied peers—as a spate of government reports and books showed only much later."After several years on the Forbes List, Trump's financial losses in the 1980s caused him to be dropped from 1990 to 1995, and reportedly obliged him to borrow from his siblings' trusts in 1993.

2000s and 2010s 
In 2005, The New York Times referred to Trump's "verbal billions" in a skeptical article about Trump's self-reported wealth. At the time, three individuals with direct knowledge of Trump's finances told reporter Timothy L. O'Brien that Trump's actual net worth was between $150 and $250 million, though Trump then publicly claimed a net worth of $5 to $6 billion. Claiming libel, Trump sued the reporter (and his book publisher) for $5 billion, lost the case, and then lost again on appeal; Trump refused to turn over his unredacted tax returns despite his assertion they supported his case.

In April 2011, amid speculation whether Trump would run as a candidate in the United States presidential election of 2012, Politico quoted unnamed sources close to him stating that, if Trump should decide to run for president, he would file "financial disclosure statements that [would] show his net worth [was] in excess of $7 billion with more than $250 million of cash, and very little debt". Although Trump did not run as a candidate in the 2012 elections, his "professionally prepared" 2012 financial disclosure was published in his book, which claimed a $7billion net worth.

On June 16, 2015, just before announcing his candidacy for president of the United States, Trump released a one-page financial statement "from a big accounting firm—one of the most respected"—stating a net worth of $8,737,540,000. "I'm really rich," Trump said. Forbes believed his claim of $9billion was "a whopper", figuring it was actually $4.1 billion. (Several years later, his lawyer Michael Cohen admitted in his memoir that "I'd personally pumped in the helium into his balloon-like net worth," including by inflating his estimate of the worth of the Gucci building, and said that he knew Trump at this time had "$2 billion, absolute tops.") In June 2015, Business Insider published Trump's June 2014 financial statement, noting that $3.3 billion of that total is represented by "Real Estate Licensing Deals, Brand and Branded Developments", described by Business Insider as "basically [implying] that Trump values his character at $3.3 billion". Forbes reduced its estimate of Trump's net worth by $125 million following Trump's controversial 2015 remarks about Mexican undocumented immigrants, which ended Trump's business contracts with NBCUniversal, Univision, Macy's, Serta, PVH Corporation, and Perfumania.

In March 2016, Forbes estimated his net worth at $4.5 billion. A year later, shortly after his inauguration, they lowered it by $1 billion, and by the end of his presidential term, they had subtracted yet another $1 billion.

During the three years after Trump announced his presidential run in 2015, Forbes estimated his net worth declined 31% and his ranking fell 138 spots on the Forbes list of the wealthiest Americans. In its 2018 and 2019 billionaires rankings, Forbes estimated Trump's net worth at $3.1 billion. (In 2018, this was 766th in the world, 248th in the U.S. In 2019, this was 715th in the world, 259th in the U.S.) Bloomberg Billionaires Index listed Trump's net worth as $2.48 billion on May 31, 2018, and Wealth-X listed it as at least $3.8 billion on July 16, 2018.

Debt and FEC filings
In July 2015, federal election regulators released new details of Trump's self-reported wealth and financial holdings when he became a Republican presidential candidate, reporting that his assets are worth above $1.4 billion, which includes at least $70 million in stocks, and a debt of at least $265 million. According to Bloomberg, for the purposes of Trump's FEC filings Trump "only reported revenue for [his] golf properties in his campaign filings even though the disclosure form asks for income", noting independent filings showing all three of his major European golf properties were unprofitable.

Mortgages on Trump's major properties—including Trump Tower, 40 Wall Street, and the Trump National Doral golf course—each fall into the "above $50 million" range, the highest reportable category on FEC filings, with Trump paying interest rates ranging from 4% to 7.125%. Mortgages on those three properties were separately reported as $100 million, $160 million, and $125 million in 2013. Trump is a leaseholder, not owner, of the land beneath 40 Wall Street. Other outstanding Trump mortgages and debts are pegged to current market interest rates. A 2012 report from Trump's accounting firm estimated $451.7 million in debt and other collateral obligations. Filings in 2015 disclosed debt of $504 million, according to Fortune magazine. Bloomberg documented debt of at least $605 million in 2016. Trump's outstanding debt was at least $650 million in August 2016, in addition to an outstanding loan of $950 million to the Bank of China and Deutsche Bank (among other creditors) on 1290 Avenue of the Americas, in which Trump is a minority owner.  In April 2020, it was reported that Trump was tens of millions of dollars in debt to China. In 2012, Trump's real estate partner refinanced the building 1290 Avenue of the Americas for almost $1 billion. The debt includes $211 million from the state-owned Bank of China, which matures in 2022. Trump owns a 30% stake in 1290 Avenue of the Americas.

Trump reported a yearly income of $362 million for 2014 and $611 million from January 2015 to May 2016. Trump and his family reported more than $500 million of income in mid-2018 financial disclosure forms.

A July 2015 campaign press release, issued one month after Trump announced his presidential run, said the FEC did not design its reports to accommodate "a man of Mr. Trump's massive wealth" and that his net worth is "in excess of [$10 billion]".

In September 2020, The New York Times noted that Trump "is personally responsible for loans and other debts totaling $421 million, with most of it coming due within four years" and no obvious way to repay them. As of December 2020, he owed about $330 million to Deutsche Bank, due in 2023 and 2024. The subsequent resignation of Trump's accounting firm, Mazars, on the grounds that Trump had provided them with inaccurate information for ten years of financial statements, will make it more difficult for Trump to refinance, said Bloomberg Opinion executive editor Tim O'Brien.

Trump has a total of over $1 billion in debts, borrowed to finance his assets, reported Forbes in October 2020. Around $640 million or more was owed to various banks (Deutsche Bank, Professional Bank, Amboy Bank, and Investors Savings Bank) and trust organizations (Ladder Capital, Chevy Chase Trust Holdings, and the Bryn Mawr Trust Company). Around $450 million was owed to unknown creditors, due to loans related to his properties of 1290 Avenue of the Americas and 555 California Street. In addition, Trump owes over $50 million to Chicago Unit Acquisition LLC, a company he owns, which would indicate that this company is worth over $50 million; however Trump has not disclosed any value for this company on his financial disclosure report. Overall, Trump's assets still outvalue his debts, reported Forbes.

Trump on his own net worth
Trump has often given much higher values for his wealth than organizations estimating it. Trump has testified that "my net worth fluctuates, and it goes up and down with markets and with attitudes and with feelings—even my own feelings". On the same day, Trump's own stated estimates of his net worth have varied by as much as $3.3 billion. Trump has also acknowledged that past exaggerated estimates of his wealth have been "good for financing". Forbes has said that although Trump "shares a lot of information with us that helps us get to the figures we publish", he "consistently pushes for a higher net worth—especially when it comes to the value of his personal brand".

In February 2022, Trump claimed in a defensive argument regarding the New York investigations of The Trump Organization that his net worth was "approximately $8 to $9 billion", based on his brand value and "transactions which have or will take place".

House subpoenas and court rulings
On May 10, 2019, House Ways and Means Committee chairman Richard Neal subpoenaed the Treasury Department and the IRS for six years of Trump's tax returns. Seven days later, Treasury Secretary Steve Mnuchin refused to comply with the subpoenas.

On May 20, 2019, President Trump lost an unrelated lawsuit in which he sought to stop his accounting firm, Mazars USA, from complying with a subpoena from the House Oversight Committee for various financial records. The ruling against Trump was issued by Judge Amit Mehta of the U.S. District Court for the District of Columbia, who also denied the president a stay of the ruling pending any future appeal.

On November 4, 2019, the 2nd U.S. Circuit Court of Appeals in New York upheld the lower court ruling. On December 10, 2019, the 2nd U.S. Circuit Court of Appeals in New York issued a ruling which again found that the lower court had acted properly in upholding the congressional subpoenas for Trump's financial records, but this time also ordered for Deutsche Bank and Capital One to cooperate in releasing the financial records as well.

On July 9, 2020, the U.S. Supreme Court ruled 7–2 that Trump cannot continue to keep his financial records secret, but ruled they should instead be given to the Manhattan DA rather than the House of Representatives. The Supreme Court denied a request for a stay on February 22, 2021, and the Manhattan DA received the financial records that same day.

New York tax law and investigations

In May 2019, both houses of the New York State Legislature, which is based in Trump's native and business home of New York, approved a bill which allows the state's tax commissioner to release any state tax return requested by the leaders of the House Ways and Means Committee, the Senate Finance Committee or the Joint Committee on Taxation for any "specific and legitimate legislative purpose".

In February 2021, Manhattan DA Cyrus Vance Jr. subpoenaed the New York City Tax Commission as well as Trump's creditors as part of a criminal investigation into possible property tax fraud by the Trump Organization, suggesting it sought to examine the real estate values Trump had reported. The documents would disclose whether the company inflated the value of properties to secure favorable terms on loans while deflating those values to lower tax bills. In December 2021, two editors at Forbes, who had once written about Trump's estimated wealth, testified to the grand jury.

On September 21, 2022, the New York state AG, Letitia James, announced a civil lawsuit against Trump, the Trump Organization, and his children Donald Jr., Ivanka, and Eric for misrepresenting assets. Former Trump Organization CFO Allen Weisselberg and Eric Trump had each invoked their Fifth Amendment right against self-incrimination over 500 times during their interviews (September 24 and October 5, 2020, respectively). In late 2021, James subpoenaed testimony from Donald Trump, Ivanka Trump and Donald Trump Jr., and although Trump sued the AG, in early 2022 a New York judge upheld the subpoenas.

In mid-2021, the RNC agreed to pay $1.6 million toward Trump's legal bills in the New York investigations, although they concern business dealings that occurred before he became president. In October 2021, the RNC paid Trump's attorneys over $121,000 to address what the RNC claimed were "politically motivated legal proceedings waged against President Trump."

In January 2022, a filing by the New York AG reported that Trump's tax documents show that his liquid assets were about $93 million in 2020. In September, James sued Trump, his three oldest children, and the organization, alleging over 200 instances of fraud and asserting that Trump "wildly exaggerated his net worth by billions of dollars". The lawsuit seeks $250 million in damages and the instatement of a five-year ban from real-estate transactions.

See also
Tax March
Timeline of investigations into Trump and Russia (2019–2020)
Veracity of statements by Donald Trump

References

Donald Trump
Wealth